Rekha Sindhu (16 July 1994 – 5 May 2017) was an Indian actress and model known for her work in Kannada and Tamil TV Programs.

She died in a car crash on the Chennai-Bengaluru Highway on 5 May 2017.

References

1994 births
2017 deaths
Kannada actresses